The Shadow Ministry of Malcolm Turnbull was the opposition Coalition shadow ministry of Australia from September 2008 to December 2009, opposing Kevin Rudd's Australian Labor Party ministry.

The Shadow Cabinet of Australia (also known as the Opposition Front Bench) is a group of senior Opposition spokespeople who form an alternative cabinet to the government's, whose members "shadow" or "mark" each individual member of the government. Malcolm Turnbull defeated Brendan Nelson in the Liberal Party's 2008 leadership spill 45 votes to 41, making Turnbull Opposition Leader. Turnbull announced his Shadow Cabinet on 22 September 2008. It was reshuffled on 16 February when Julie Bishop stepped down from the role of Shadow Treasury. The Shadow Cabinet of Malcolm Turnbull was replaced by the Shadow Cabinet of Tony Abbott in December 2009 following the 2009 Liberal Party leadership spill.

Members of the Shadow Cabinet (2008–2009) 

1 Tony Abbott, Nick Minchin and Eric Abetz quit the Coalition front bench on 26 November 2009.

Members of the Outer Shadow Ministry (2008–2009)

Shadow Parliamentary Secretaries (2008–2009)

See also
 First Rudd Ministry

References

External links
 Parliament of Australia, Official current Shadow Ministry list. Retrieved January 2008

Liberal Party of Australia
National Party of Australia
Turnbull